HLA-DR3 is composed of the HLA-DR17 and HLA-DR18 split 'antigens' serotypes. DR3 is a component gene-allele of the AH8.1 haplotype in Northern and Western Europeans. Genes between B8 and DR3 on this haplotype are frequently associated with autoimmune disease. Type 1 diabetes mellitus is associated with HLA-DR3 or HLA-DR4. Nearly half the US population has either DR3 or DR4 (only 1–3% have both), yet only a small percentage (about 0.5%) of these individuals will develop type 1 diabetes.

Serology

Some DR3 also react with HLA-DR17 and/or HLA-DR18. The DRB1*0304 primarily reacts with DR3. The serotypes of *0305, *0306, *0308 to *0331 are unknown.

Disease associations

By serotype
HLA-DR3 is associated with early-age onset myasthenia gravis, Hashimoto's thyroiditis (along with DR5), primary sclerosing cholangitis, and opportunistic infections in AIDS, but lowered risk for cancers. It is also associated with membranous glomerulonephritis

By allele
DRB1*0301 (see HLA-DR17)

DRB1*0302 (See HLA-DR18)

DRB1*0304 is associated with Graves disease

By haplotypes
DR3 and/or DQ2 is associated with Moreen's ulceration, "bout onset" multiple sclerosis, Graves' disease and systemic lupus erythematosus

DR3-DQ2 linkage is associated with coeliac disease, dermatitis herpetiformis, Diabetes mellitus type 1. DR3-DR2 is the serological marker for HLA-DQ2.5cis isoform. Although it cannot identify the alpha ".5" chain of HLA DQ, DQA1*0501 gene is almost always found within the DR3-DQ2 haplotype Eurasia (however in older studies DQA1*0505 is commonly confused with DQA1*0501)

Genetic linkage
DR3 is genetically linked to HLA-DR52, DRB3*0202 allele, and HLA-DQ2 (DQ2.5).

References

3